Tuvan People's Revolutionary Party was a political party in Tuva, founded in 1921. When the Tuvan People's Republic was founded in the same year, the party held single-party control over its government as a vanguard party.

History

Under Soviet sponsorship, a conference of Tuvinian revolutionaries convened on 29 October 1921, and an organization bureau was formed. The first Congress met on 28 February 1922, when the Tuvinian "People's Government" was established. However, as soon as the Second Congress convened on 6 July 1923, the former party was dissolved because of Soviet dissatisfaction, and a new one was organized. The Fourth Congress met in October 1925; the Seventh Congress, in 1928. The Central Committee was authorized to establish party cells and branches of the league of revolutionary youth throughout the country.

During the Second Plenary Session of the Central Committee of the party in 1929 the right-wing leadership, which had intended to retain Tibetan Buddhism as a state religion in the old sense, in contradiction to the proclaimed constitution, was completely destroyed. Under the watchword of "antifeudal revolution," the Eighth Congress paved the way for socialist reconstruction and collectivization. When, in April–May 1930, the so-called "counterrevolution of the Tuvinian nobles and the Russian kulak-colonists" broke out with the intent "to overthrow the 'Revolutionary Government,'" it was also put down by force. Resolutions were adopted in the Central Committee of the People's Revolutionary Party to confiscate the property of the exploiter class, to conduct agricultural collectivization "on an unconditionally voluntary basis," "to struggle for complete independence from the imperialist countries and to co-operate closely with the oppressed peoples and the working class of the whole world."

A prominent figure in its initial stage was Donduk Kuular. In 1929–1932 a political shift occurred, beginning with the 1929 Tuvan coup d'état, as nationalist elements of the party, including Kuular, were purged. The leadership of the party was taken over by Salchak Toka.

The party was admitted to the Comintern as a "sympathizing party" at its Seventh Congress in 1935.

References

Tannu Tuva
Parties of one-party systems
Political parties established in 1921
Politics of Tuva
Formerly ruling communist parties